Leendert Ginjaar (28 May 1928 – 17 September 2003) was a Dutch politician of the People's Party for Freedom and Democracy (VVD) and chemist.

Ginjaar attended a Gymnasium in Leiden from April 1940 until May 1946 and applied at the Leiden University in June 1946 majoring in Chemistry and obtaining a Bachelor of Science degree in June 1948 before graduating with a Master of Science degree in July 1952 and worked as a researcher at the Leiden University before he got an doctorate as an Doctor of Science in Chemistry in August 1956. Ginjaar worked as a researcher at the Organisation for Applied Scientific Research from August 1956 until December 1977 and served as Director of the department of Climatology from February 1970 until December 1977. Ginjaar served on the Provincial-Council of South Holland from July 1971 until December 1977. Ginjaar also served as a Member of the Scientific Council for Government Policy from 1 July 1973 until 19 December 1977.

After the election of 1977 Ginjaar was appointed as Minister of Health and Environment in the Cabinet Van Agt-Wiegel, taking office on 19 December 1977. Ginjaar served as acting Minister for Science Policy from 1 April 1979 until 3 May 1979 following the death of Rinus Peijnenburg. In December 1980 Ginjaar announced that he wouldn't stand for the election of 1981 but wanted to run for the Senate. Ginjaar was elected as a Member of the Senate after the Senate election of 1981, taking office on 25 August 1981 serving as a frontbencher chairing the parliamentary committee for Higher Education and Science Policy and the parliamentary committee for Housing and Spatial Planning and spokesperson for the Environment, Higher Education and Agriculture. The Cabinet Van Agt–Wiegel was replaced by the Cabinet Van Agt II following the cabinet formation of 1981 on 11 September 1981. Ginjaar also served as Chairmen of the People's Party for Freedom and Democracy from 29 November 1986 until 4 October 1991. Ginjaar served as a distinguished professor of Medical ethics at the Utrecht University from 1 September 1982 until 1 January 1986 and also served as Chairman of the Education board of the Utrecht University from 10 September 1982 until 1 January 1986 and a distinguished professor of Climatology and Medical research at the State University of Limburg from 1 March 1990 until 1 September 1994. Ginjaar was selected as Parliamentary leader of the People's Party for Freedom and Democracy in the Senate following the election of Frits Korthals Altes as President of the Senate, serving from 11 March 1997 until 14 September 1999. In November 2002 Ginjaar announced his retirement from national politics and that he wouldn't stand for the Senate election of 2003 and continued to serve until the end of the parliamentary term on 10 June 2003.

Ginjaar was known for his abilities as a manager and policy wonk. Ginjaar continued to comment on political affairs until his death four months later at the age of 75. His wife Nell was also a politician who served as State Secretary for Education and Sciences from 5 November 1982 until 7 November 1989.

Decorations

References

External links

Official
  Dr. L. (Leendert) Ginjaar Parlement & Politiek
  Dr. L. Ginjaar (VVD) Eerste Kamer der Staten-Generaal

 

1928 births
2003 deaths
Commanders Crosses of the Order of Merit of the Federal Republic of Germany
Commanders of the Order of Orange-Nassau
Commanders of the Order of the Crown (Belgium)
Chairmen of the People's Party for Freedom and Democracy
Dutch academic administrators
20th-century Dutch chemists
Dutch conservationists
Dutch climatologists
Dutch lobbyists
Dutch natural scientists
Dutch nonprofit directors
Dutch nonprofit executives
Dutch education writers
Dutch science writers
Environmental social scientists
Environmental studies scholars
Environmental writers
Knights of the Order of the Netherlands Lion
Leiden University alumni
Academic staff of Maastricht University
Ministers of Health of the Netherlands
Ministers without portfolio of the Netherlands
Members of the Provincial Council of South Holland
Members of the Royal Netherlands Academy of Arts and Sciences
Members of the Senate (Netherlands)
Members of the Scientific Council for Government Policy
People's Party for Freedom and Democracy politicians
People from Leiden
People from Goes
Sustainability advocates
Academic staff of Utrecht University
20th-century Dutch educators
20th-century Dutch male writers
20th-century Dutch politicians
21st-century Dutch politicians